Camelot Theme Park was a resort and theme park located in the English county of Lancashire. The park's theme was the well-known legend of Camelot, and the park decor incorporated pseudo-medieval elements. The site was owned by The Story Group and was operated by Knights Leisure. The park featured many rides, taking a target audience of families and younger children; however, the park also boasted numerous thrill rides and roller coasters, including Whirlwind (a Maurer Söhne spinning coaster), Knightmare and Excalibur. On 4 November 2012, Knight’s Leisure announced that they would not be reopening for the season of 2013.

The site was used for a zombie horror experience attraction, Camelot Rises between February and April 2022.

In March 2022, the Best Western Park Hall Hotel, formerly the Camelot Theme Park Hotel, permanently closed down. This has since left the entire Park Hall site empty and derelict.

History 

The park opened in 1983 and was operating seasonally until the end of 2012. The park was based on the story of 'Camelot, King Arthur and the Knights of the Round Table'. The local area was once covered by Martin Mere, sometimes described as the largest body of fresh water in England, which was first drained in 1692 by Thomas Fleetwood of Bank Hall in Bretherton.

The story was that Sir Lancelot's parents King Ban of Benwick and his queen Elaine escaped to Lancashire from their enemies in France.  Elaine went to help King Ban who had fallen and put Lancelot down on the shore of the lake, where he was abducted by nymph Vivian who vanished into the waters of the lake with him. Vivian brought up Lancelot, and when he went to King Arthur's court, he was knighted as 'Sir Lancelot of the Lake'. Martin Mere has been locally known as the 'Lost Lake of Sir Lancelot' following the myth.

In 1986, the park was taken over by the Granada Group and operated by them alongside its now-defunct sister parks American Adventure and Granada Studios Tour. In June 1998, the park was subject to a management buyout, in which the park went to Prime Resorts Ltd. Camelot had seen a downturn in attendance in later years, in 1995, Camelot's attendance was 500,000 visitors throughout the season.

The park was featured in a 1994 episode of Sooty & Co., in which presenter Matthew Corbett takes Sooty, Sweep and Soo there. 

One of the roller coasters could be seen from the M6 near the Charnock Richard Services. However, as of February 2020 said rollercoaster "The Knightmare" has been demolished after SBNO (Standing But Not Operating) for eight years. 

In 2005, Camelot's attendance was only 336,204 visitors. 

In August 2006, in a survey of healthy food available at leading tourist attractions in the United Kingdom, Camelot came joint bottom, scoring only one point.

In February 2009, Prime Resorts announced that the park was in receivership, and would not reopen for the 2009 season. The hotel was bought by Lavender Hotels in March 2009, and in April 2009, it was announced that a buyer had been found for the park and that it would reopen in May 2009. The theme park was purchased by Story Group, a construction company based in Carlisle, and leased to Knight's Leisure who ran the park.

Closure 
The closure of the park was announced by its operator, Knights Leisure, on 4 November 2012, the managing director blaming poor summer weather and events such as London 2012 and the Diamond Jubilee for declining visitor numbers. Some roller coasters were sold, for example, the Whirlwind was relocated to Skyline Park in Germany, but others remained in the abandoned park.

The site's future was uncertain, as the new owner was planning to redevelop the site.  The then indications were that it would be a housing development.

Research published in 2019 suggested that the site of Park Hall Road in Charnock Richard is projected to be able to fit 6,294 new homes across its 140-acre site. It is reported to have a potential value, in terms of development, of around £790 million.

Future  

In August 2014, an application to build 420 houses on the site by owners Story Group was unanimously rejected by Chorley Council, with 261 public objections, as the development was not permissible within the Green Belt. 

In August 2016, a second application to build two hundred houses on the site was announced.

In March 2018, plans for 195 homes at the site were scrapped.

All planning applications to date (as of January 2022) have been rejected by Chorley Council. Housing on the site has been heavily criticised by the local communities leading to doubt over what the future is for the former theme park.

In December 2020, bulldozers were on site, demolishing a number of the structures that were considered unstable, including the iconic white castle entrance. 

By July 2021, the park had been dismantled and demolished, albeit having been crumbling away and damaged several times by arson and vandalism since the park’s closure in 2012. Parts of some of the rides and pieces of the park still stand on the site, though in February 2020, Knightmare, the signature ride at the park, was dismantled after being standing and left in the elements for eight years.

Camelot Rises 
Between February and April of 2022, the former theme park site was used for a drive-thru zombie-themed horror experience operated by Park N' Party, named Camelot Rises. Guests would take part in an immersive drive-thru horror experience subsequently watch a horror film at the main entrance while in their cars.

Rides and shows

Rides and attractions

The following rides were operating at the time of the park's closure in 2012.

Roller coasters

Thrill rides

Family rides

Children's rides

Shows

Jousting Tournament – a live joust performed by Camelot's own Knights, led by an actor playing King Arthur and performed in the Avalon Arena. The park hosted the only full-time jousting arena in the United Kingdom.
Merlin's Magic Show – performed in Merlin's castle, this show demonstrated 'Merlin's magical skills'.
Merlin's School of Wizardry – performed in Merlin's castle, Merlin's School of Wizardry taught some of Merlin's magic to the audience.
Birds of Prey Show – performed daily in the Avalon Arena, featuring an African fish eagle.

Other defunct attractions

Past rides

Past shows
Cats of the Round Table – an animatronic show that was near the front of the park.
Sooty and the Dragon – a puppet show to do with a popular puppet.

Accidents
On 22 October 2001, Harry Mathews, a park employee, was struck by The Gauntlet roller coaster and was killed whilst repairing the tracks. The park was fined £40,000, and charged £20,000 in costs in September 2003, as it had no written safety procedures for its staff.
On 23 August 2011, a twelve-year-old boy fell 30 ft from the Excalibur 2 ride. He survived but suffered serious injuries.

See also
Incidents at European amusement parks

References

External links

 www.camelotthemepark.co.uk - Camelot Theme Park Official Website via the Web Archive, captured on 20 September 2012. The site had gone blank by the next capture on 6 December, and by 23 March 2013 had expired. It has now been taken by a coaster blogger.

Defunct amusement parks in England
1983 establishments in England
Buildings and structures in the Borough of Chorley
Defunct amusement parks in the United Kingdom
2012 disestablishments in England
Amusement parks opened in 1983
Amusement parks closed in 2012
Cultural depictions of Arthurian legend
Modern ruins